My Son Is Guilty is a 1939 American action adventure crime film directed by Charles Barton and produced by Jack Fier. It stars Bruce Cabot, Jacqueline Wells, Harry Carey and Wynne Gibson.

Plot
Tim Kerry (Harry Carey), a veteran cop in the district of Hell's Kitchen, welcomes his son Ritzy (Bruce Cabot) after spending two years in prison. Ritzy has good friends and his former wife Julia (Julie Bishop) is hopeful that it will go on the right track. But the head of the gang, Morelli (Wynne Gibson) knows that Ritzy has good talent for crime, and makes a great offer, very hard to refuse.

Cast

References 
The Great Gangster Pictures II, by James Robert Parish, Michael R. Pitts

External links

1939 films
1930s crime films
1930s English-language films
Films directed by Charles Barton
American black-and-white films
Columbia Pictures films
American crime films
American action adventure films
1930s action adventure films
1930s American films